Eagleville is the name of two census-designated places in the U.S. state of Pennsylvania:

Eagleville, Centre County, Pennsylvania, pop. 324
Eagleville, Montgomery County, Pennsylvania, pop. 4800